Beth Morrison may refer to:

Beth Morrison, American producer of contemporary opera
Beth Morrison, character in Alex in Wonderland

See also
Elizabeth Morrison (disambiguation)